American Chopper is an American reality television series that airs on Discovery Channel, produced by Pilgrim Films & Television. The series centers on Paul Teutul Sr. (frequently called Senior), and his son Paul Teutul Jr. (also known as Paulie or simply Junior), who manufacture custom chopper-style motorcycles. Orange County Choppers is in Newburgh, New York. The contrasting work and creative styles of the father-and-son team and their resulting verbal arguments were the series' hallmark until 2008 when an explosive argument led to Paul Jr.'s termination and departure to start a competing chopper company, Paul Jr. Designs.
 
The series originally aired on Discovery Channel beginning in March 2003. In December 2007, the series moved to Discovery's sister channel TLC, starting off with an 18-hour marathon. Its first TLC season premiered in January 2008. Season 6 began in April 2009 but the series was canceled by TLC in February 2010. In July 2010, TLC announced that the Teutuls would return in a new series, American Chopper: Senior vs. Junior. Senior vs. Junior premiered on TLC but was soon moved to Discovery halfway through the first season. Discovery Channel announced that the show would end with "The Chopper Live: The Revenge" show on December 11, 2012 after 10 years.

Featured staff 

The OCC fabricators and mechanics such as Paul Teutul Jr., Rick Petko, Nick Hansford, Christian Welter, and former employees Vincent DiMartino (who left OCC to start V-Force Customs in 2007), and Cody Connelly (a BOCES student intern who has since joined DiMartino's business), create dozens of custom motorbikes. Michael Teutul, usually referred to as "Mikey", serves as the shop's custodian and webmaster, and provides comic relief to the show. He has been seen doing metal work occasionally, as one of his early jobs was working at Orange County Ironworks. Also featured occasionally is Danny Teutul, the second oldest child, who succeeded Paul Sr. as the owner of Orange County Ironworks. Danny visits to do contracted work for the OCC facilities. The show also documents their personal and promotional activities ranging from magazine photo shoots to family holidays and custom bike shows.

Original series (2002–2010)

Series overview

Fantasy Bike Contest  
During season 3, Discovery Channel sponsored a contest in which four winners received OCC motorcycles. Custom bike features were specified by the winning fans, who sent in videos expressing their reasons for wanting a bike. The contest winners were (in episode order): Jeff Clegg (Corporal Punishment), Susan Morisset (Female Snake Bike), Joseph McClendon (Custom Hog), Bryan King (Vertebrate Trike).

Paul Jr. leaves Orange County Choppers 
Following regular disagreements with his father, Paul Jr. was fired from the shop in late 2008. In January 2009, TLC served a notice of default due to Paul Jr.'s absence. Paul Jr. then returned to OCC briefly as a contractor, but left finally in April 2009 in order to start his own design firm, Paul Jr. Designs. Paul Sr. then exercised a contractual option to purchase Paul Jr.'s 20% share in OCC, and subsequently filed a lawsuit to force the buyout. The case remained ongoing while a valuation of OCC was performed.

On December 14, 2010, Paul Jr. won his appeal of a lower court ruling forcing him to sell his 20% ownership of OCC to Paul Sr. Paul Jr.'s appeal asked that the agreement to sell be ruled invalid, so Paul Jr. will continue to own 20% of OCC until a fair selling price is agreed to. Paul Jr. has also filed a counter-suit laying out massive fraud on Paul Sr.'s part in dealing with Paul Jr.'s interests at OCC. The suit seeks $100 million in damages along with court-ordered controls over the company's finances to prevent further fraud.

After a one-year non-compete clause ended, Paul Jr. opened a motorcycle design company in April 2010. TLC then commissioned a 7th season titled American Chopper: Senior vs. Junior which features both OCC and Paul Jr. Designs.

Other legal issues 
As of May 26, 2009, OCC is the defendant in a legal action filed by artist Justin Barnes, who alleges that his original designs were copied on merchandise without his permission and appropriate compensation.

In July 2009, Cody Connelly sued OCC and Paul Teutul Sr., seeking damages for misappropriation of likeness, breach of contract and fraud. He claimed the show used his likeness in posters, coloring books and other merchandise after he left it in 2007. Connelly also claimed that he never received "the old school chopper" that he helped design, though Paul Teutul Sr., said it would be his in one episode of the show.

Cancellation and Senior vs. Junior 
On February 6, 2010, TLC announced that American Chopper's season finale scheduled for February 11 would also mark the end of the series, stating, "The Teutuls will always be a part of the Discovery family and we congratulate them on a tremendously successful series run." On April 7, TLC announced the Teutuls would return for a new series.

The new series, American Chopper: Senior vs. Junior, chronicles the aftermath of Paul Jr.'s departure from OCC and his construction of a new custom chopper company across the street from younger brother Dan's Orange County Iron Works.  It premiered August 12, 2010 on TLC.

In December 2010, Senior vs. Junior was moved to the Discovery Channel, the network American Chopper originally debuted on. In Canada American Chopper started on January 8 on TLC and moved to Saturday nights at 10 p.m.

On February 7, 2011, Paul Teutul Jr. announced that American Chopper: Senior vs. Junior had been renewed for a second season and would return spring 2011.

On November 21, 2012, Eileen O'Neill, president of Discovery Network, announced the show had been cancelled. The final episode aired December 17, 2012.

First series spin-off: Senior vs. Junior (2010–2012) 

American Chopper: Senior vs. Junior is a reality television spin-off which premiered on the TLC channel on August 12, 2010. The show chronicles the rivalry between Orange County Choppers (OCC) owned by Paul Teutul Sr. and his son Paul Teutul Jr.'s newly opened motorcycle business Paul Jr. Designs (PJD). The second season continued with brand new episodes that aired on Monday, August 29, 2011 at 9pm EST on Discovery Channel. The third season began on February 13, 2012. The fourth season premiered, September 3, 2012. November 16, 2012, the Discovery Channel announced the cancellation of the show. The final episode aired December 17, 2012. Paul Teutul posted a picture of himself with his father and brother Mike all posing in front of the Teutel bike that junior and  senior built during season 4.

Series overview 

The cast makes an appearance on Season 2, Episode 3 "American Chopper Gun", of Sons of Guns where the crews collaborate on a dragon-themed gun. This episode coincides with American Chopper: Senior vs. Junior Season 2, Episode 2 "Big Guns".

Opening 
The introduction is narrated by both Paul Sr. and Paul Jr.:

The fourth season (returning to American Chopper) intro is narrated by Paul Sr. and Paul Jr.:

Second series spin-off: Orange County Choppers (2013–2014) 
Orange County Choppers is the second spin-off series of the American Chopper franchise. The show ran for one season on CMT with a 2-hour "pilot" and eight episodes between August 18, 2013 and January 11, 2014.

The series features Paul Teutul Sr. and his team as they fabricate some of the most complicated choppers of their careers. Evan Favaro is hired as Creative Director and proves his leadership ability and building skills at the shop.

Series overview

December 2014 special 

On December 11, 2014, Discovery Channel aired an American Chopper special under the title "American Chopper: Shaq Bike", which featured the building of a chopper for former NBA star Shaquille O'Neal. It focused on the original Orange County Choppers business, with no sign of Paul Jr., though Michael Teutul (listed as a vice president) did appear and interact with his father. While there were a few new family members and fabricators, the crew at the shop appeared to be the same as the cast of the Orange County Choppers series, including Evan Favaro. According to Paul Sr., the Shaq "Man of Steel" bike is the biggest in OCC history. The specs: 48-inch handlebars, 6-inch rake, 23-inch front wheel and 20-inch rear wheel on a stretched frame.

Original series revival (2018–2019) 
A revival of the series aired in the spring of 2018 on Discovery Channel. According to the series Facebook page, the new season premiered on May 28, 2018 at 10 p.m. ET/PT on Discovery Channel.

A preview of the first episode of season 11 entitled "Welcome Back" aired on March 1, 2018. The episode featured the return of the Teutuls after ten years of their rocky father-son partnership, catching up to speed with Senior and Junior's separate lives and motorcycle businesses. At Orange County Choppers, Paul Sr. gets a two bike deal with Okada Resort in Manila, Philippines. Meanwhile, Paul Jr. works on a bike for Buffalo Chip Campground in Sturgis, South Dakota. Both come together when Junior asks his father to restore their Yankees bike which had been vandalized and then sold at an auto salvage auction.

Series overview

August 2020 special 
On July 28, 2020, it was announced that a TV special titled "American Chopper: The Last Ride" would premiere on August 4, 2020. The 2-hour special featured Senior and Junior who, over a decade, finally collaborate on building a bike together. This is the first time in series history that Orange County Choppers and Paul Junior Designs come together for one client. For one last time at the old OCC shop, they build a chopper for ABC Supply Company, the largest roofing and siding company in the U.S. However, they only have eight weeks to complete the bike because their original garage in Montgomery, NY is planned to be demolished.

Release

Home media

Other media

Video games 
Due to its popularity during the first seasons, American Chopper inspired two video game titles. The first was American Chopper by Activision Value, released for PlayStation 2, Microsoft Windows, and Xbox on November 23, 2004. The second, American Chopper 2: Full Throttle by Creat Studios was released for GameCube, PlayStation 2, and Xbox on November 16, 2005.

A video pinball arcade game made by Incredible Technologies reached on-site play testing but was never released.

Meme
A series of memes were made using frames from the argument between Paul Teutel Sr. & Paul Teutel Jr. in season 6 episode 1. The meme format features captions placed over the two men in certain frames during their argument. The captions usually show some common argument in the current culture.

Parody 
American Body Shop, an improvisational comedy shown on Comedy Central from July 8 to September 19, 2007, is a parody  of American Chopper.

Azeroth Choppers 
Azeroth Choppers was a weekly web series moderated by Blizzard Entertainment that featured Paul Teutul Jr. and his Paul Jr. Designs (PJD) team. The web series was shown between April 17 and June 5, 2014. It showcased the two motorcycle builds based around each of two factions, Alliance and Horde, in the MMORPG World of Warcraft.

Accolades

See also 
 Orange County Choppers bikes

References

External links 
 
 
 Pilgrim Films American Chopper Website
 American Chopper: Senior vs. Junior official website
 
 

 
2003 American television series debuts
2010 American television series endings
2000s American reality television series
2010s American reality television series
Discovery Channel original programming
English-language television shows
Motorcycle television series
PlayStation 2 games
Xbox games
TLC (TV network) original programming
Television shows set in New York (state)
Television series by Lionsgate Television
American television series revived after cancellation
2018 American television series debuts